Samuel Davidson "Dave" Herron (October 16, 1897 – January 27, 1956) was an American amateur golfer.

Herron won the 1919 U.S. Amateur at Oakmont Country Club, his home club, defeating Bobby Jones in the final, 5 and 4.

Herron played on the winning 1923 Walker Cup team. He also won the Pennsylvania Amateur twice.

Amateur wins
this list may be incomplete
1919 U.S. Amateur
1920 Pennsylvania Amateur
1929 Pennsylvania Amateur

U.S. national team appearances
Walker Cup: 1923 (winners)

References

American male golfers
Amateur golfers
Golfers from Pittsburgh
1897 births
1956 deaths